Milenko Nedelkovski Show was a television talk show from North Macedonia hosted by Milenko Nedelkovski.

Season 10
Standard Season 10 Guests: Vasko Stamevski, Oliver Andonov, Vladimir Bozinovski, Nikola Srbov, Ljubco Zlatev, Boban Nonkovic, Toni Mihajlovski,

This list is not complete

Season 9

This list is not complete

Season 8

This list is not complete

Season 7

This list is not complete

Season 6

This list is not complete

Season 5

This list is not complete

Season 4

This list is not complete

Season 3

This list is not complete

Season 2

This list is not complete

Season 1

This list is not complete

See also
Vo Centar so Vasko Eftov
Eden na Eden
Ednooki
Jadi Burek

External links
 Official You Tube Channel

References

Macedonian television series
Kanal 5 (North Macedonian TV channel) original programming